The 25th Klippan Lady Open was held in Klippan, Sweden, between 16 February and 18 February 2018.

Medal table

Team ranking

Medal summary

Women's freestyle

Results

Women's freestyle

50 kg 
17 February and 18 February

53 kg 
17 February and 18 February

55 kg 
17 February and 18 February

57 kg 
17 February and 18 February

59 kg 
17 February and 18 February

62 kg 
17 February and 18 February

65 kg 
17 February and 18 February

68 kg 
17 February and 18 February

72 kg 
17 February and 18 February

76 kg 
17 February and 18 February

Participating nations

References

External links 

 
 

2018 in sport wrestling
2018 in women's sport wrestling